Pier-Luc Funk (born May 5, 1994) is a Canadian film and television actor from Quebec. He is most noted for his role as Maxime in the 2018 film Genesis (Genèse), for which he received a Prix Iris nomination for Best Supporting Actor at the 21st Quebec Cinema Awards.

Funk had his first acting role in childhood, as the protagonist of the 2008 film A No-Hit No-Run Summer (Un été sans point ni coup sûr). Following that he joined the cast of the teen drama series Tactik, in which he played Samuel Langevin from 2009 to 2013.

In 2014 and 2015 he was a cast member in SNL Québec, a Quebec-based adaptation of Saturday Night Live. After the show was cancelled by Télé-Québec in 2015, he joined the cast of the new series Le nouveau show. In the same year he joined the cast of the drama series Mémoires vives as Jérémie, a sinister character who plotted and carried out a kidnapping of the main character's daughter. In 2017, he won the Prix Gémeaux for Best Actor in a Drama Series for Mémoires vives, the youngest actor to win in the history of the category.

In 2021 Funk hosted Sans rancune, a TVA variety series. In an episode devoted to drag queens in February, Funk participated in a lipsync battle against Rita Baga.

Filmography
 2008 - A No-Hit No-Run Summer (Un été sans point ni coup sûr): Martin
 2013 - Vic and Flo Saw a Bear (Vic+Flo ont vu un ours): Charlot Smith
 2014 - 1987: Dallaire
 2015 - The Demons (Les Démons): Ben 
 2015 - Aurélie Laflamme: Les pieds sur terre: Jean-Benoît Houde
 2016 - Kiss Me Like a Lover (Embrasse-moi comme tu m'aimes): Donat
 2017 - Sashinka: Prêteur sur gages
 2018 - Genesis (Genèse): Maxime
 2019 - Matthias & Maxime: Rivette
 2020 - Flashwood: Luc
 2021 - Entre deux draps: Antoine
 2021 - The Time Thief (L'Arracheuse de temps)

References

External links

1994 births
21st-century Canadian male actors
Canadian male child actors
Canadian male film actors
Canadian male television actors
Canadian sketch comedians
Male actors from Quebec
People from Laval, Quebec
French Quebecers
Living people
Canadian male comedians
Canadian television variety show hosts